Ulrich Schreck (born 11 March 1962) is a German fencer. He won a silver medal in the team foil event at the 1988 Summer Olympics and a gold in the same event at the 1992 Summer Olympics.

He is now federal coach to the Germany men's foil team.

References

External links
 

1962 births
Living people
German male fencers
German foil fencers
Olympic fencers of West Germany
Olympic fencers of Germany
Fencers at the 1988 Summer Olympics
Fencers at the 1992 Summer Olympics
Olympic silver medalists for West Germany
Olympic gold medalists for Germany
Olympic medalists in fencing
People from Tauberbischofsheim
Sportspeople from Stuttgart (region)
Medalists at the 1988 Summer Olympics
Medalists at the 1992 Summer Olympics